Gatis Jahovičs (born August 11, 1984) is a Latvian former professional basketball player. He last played for BK Liepājas Lauvas in LBL. He is 2.00 m (6 ft 6.75 in) and a small forward.

Latvian national team
Jahovičs is also a member of the Latvian national basketball team.

References

External links
Eurobasket Profile

1984 births
Living people
ASK Riga players
BK VEF Rīga players
KK Włocławek players
Latvian men's basketball players
Small forwards
Basketball players from Riga